is a town located in Saitama Prefecture, Japan. , the town had an estimated population of 11,352 in 5038 households and a population density of 280 persons per km². The town is famous for its Prunus mume orchards.

Geography
Ogose is located in central Saitama Prefecture, approximately 50 kilometers from downtown Tokyo.

Surrounding municipalities
Saitama Prefecture
Hannō
Moroyama
Tokigawa
Hatoyama

Climate
Ogose has a humid subtropical climate (Köppen Cfa) characterized by warm summers and cool winters with light to no snowfall.  The average annual temperature in Ogose is 13.8 °C. The average annual rainfall is 1746 mm with September as the wettest month. The temperatures are highest on average in August, at around 25.4 °C, and lowest in January, at around 2.3 °C.

Demographics
Per Japanese census data, the population of Ogose peaked around the year 2000 and has declined since.

History
Ogose town was created within Iruma District, Saitama with the establishment of the modern municipalities system on April 1, 1889. Ogose annexed neighboring Umezono village on February 1, 1955.

Government
Ogose has a mayor-council form of government with a directly elected mayor and a unicameral town council of 12 members. Ogose, together with the towns of Hatoyama and Moroyama, contributes one member to the Saitama Prefectural Assembly. In terms of national politics, the town is part of Saitama 9th district of the lower house of the Diet of Japan.

Economy
Ogose remains largely an agricultural town, primarily based on horticulture, although it has increasingly become a bedroom community.

Education
Ogose has two public elementary schools and one public middle school operated by the town government, and one public high school operated by the Saitama Prefectural Board of Education. In addition, there are two private high schools.

Transportation

Railway
 JR East – Hachikō Line
 
 Tōbu Railway - Tōbu Ogose Line
 -

Highway
Ogose is not served by any expressways or national highways

Local attractions
 Ogose Plum Gardens
 Kuroyama waterfalls

Noted people from Ogose
Yusuke Shimada, professional football player

References

External links

Official Website 

Towns in Saitama Prefecture
Ogose, Saitama